This list covers all passenger railway stations and halts in Brandenburg that are used by scheduled and seasonal traffic.

Description

The list is organised as follows:

 Name: the current name of the station or halt.
 Urban/Rural county (Kreis): This column shows the county in which the station is located. The abbreviations used correspond to those used for German car number plates. The individual counties in Brandenburg are:

 Barnim (BAR)
 Brandenburg (Havel) (BRB)
 Cottbus (CB)
 Dahme-Spreewald (LDS)
 Elbe-Elster (EE)
 Frankfurt (Oder) (FF)
 Havelland (HVL)
 Märkisch-Oderland (MOL)
 Oberhavel (OHV)
 Oberspreewald-Lausitz (OSL)
 Oder-Spree (LOS)
 Ostprignitz-Ruppin (OPR)
 Potsdam (P)
 Potsdam-Mittelmark (PM)
 Prignitz (PR)
 Spree-Neisse (SPN)
 Teltow-Fläming (TF)
 Uckermark (UM)

 Railway operator: Several stations in Brandenburg are run by the Verkehrsverbund Berlin-Brandenburg (VBB). In the border area with Saxony there are, however, also overlaps with the neighbouring Verkehrsverbund Oberelbe (VVO) and the Zweckverband Verkehrsverbund Oberlausitz-Niederschlesien (ZVON).
 Cat: The Cat column shows the current category of the station as at  1 January 2008. This only applies to stations run by the DB Station&Service and excludes stations runs by private operators like the Niederbarnimer Eisenbahn.
 The next five columns show which types of train stop at the station. The abbreviations are those used by the DB AG but apply to similar train types of other operators:
 ICE – Intercity-Express and the like
 IC – Intercity, Eurocity and the like, e.g. Interconnex
 RE – Regional-Express and the like
 RB – Regionalbahn and the like. In Brandenburg private operators use a different abbreviation from the DB Regio trains for trademark reasons. These are usually related to the name of the operator, e.g. NE27 is a train run by the Niederbarnimer Eisenbahn. A detailed explanation is given here: :de:Eisenbahnen in Brandenburg und Berlin.
 S – S-Bahn
 Line – This column gives the railway line on which the station is situated. Only those routes are named that are still in operation, e.g. the stations of Löwenberg (Mark) and Prenzlau are both on the Löwenberg–Prenzlau railway. Because this is only worked from Löwenberg to Templin it is not mentioned under Prenzlau.
 Remarks – In this column additional information is supplied, particularly with regard to the operators and seasonal services.

Station overview

See also 
German railway station categories
Railway station types of Germany
List of railway stations in the Berlin area

References

External links 
 Regional railway services in Berlin and Brandenburg (pdf file, 253 kB)
 Online timetable of DB services

 
Bran
Rail